Andrew Quattrin (born 29 August 1996) is a Canadian rugby union player. Quattrin plays Hooker for the Toronto Arrows in Major League Rugby (MLR). He also represents Canada by playing for the Canadian rugby team.

Rugby career

International rugby
He previously represented Canada at age grade level playing for Canada U20 in 2016.

Profesional rugby union
Quattrin played for the Ontario Blues during the 2016 through the 2018 seasons.

On 11 December 2018, Quattrin signed a professional contract with the Toronto Arrows of Major League Rugby.

During the 2022 MLR Championship Final, Quattrin was the recipient of the inaugural S. Marcus Calloway Community Impact Award. Quattrin was presented with a commemorative trophy and a $5,000 donation to his non-profit, Optimism Place.

Club statistics

References 

Toronto Arrows players
Canadian rugby union players
Wilfrid Laurier University alumni
Living people
1996 births
Canada international rugby union players
Rugby union hookers
New England Free Jacks players